Wei Kexing (born 13 February 1963) is a Chinese former footballer who most recently was interim manager for Beijing Guoan in the Chinese Super League.

Playing career
After progressing through the youth team at Beijing, Wei made his debut for the club in 1985. After playing for Japanese club Fujitsu SC and Hong Kong club Happy Valley for a total of two seasons, Wei returned to his native China to play for Beijing Guoan until his retirement in 1997.

On 29 January 1985, Wei scored for China in the Nehru Cup against Yugoslavia.

Management career
Following Milovan Đorić leaving Beijing Guoan after just three games of the 2000 Jia-A League season, Wei took up the managerial role of the club until late 2002. On 21 September 2010, Wei was named interim manager of Beijing Guoan for the final seven games of the 2010 season, following the sacking of Hong Yuanshuo.

Personal life
Wei is a member of the Communist Party of China.

References

1963 births
Living people
Footballers from Qingdao
Chinese footballers
Association football defenders
Association football midfielders
Beijing Guoan F.C. players
Kawasaki Frontale players
Happy Valley AA players
Japan Soccer League players
Hong Kong First Division League players
China international footballers
Footballers at the 1994 Asian Games
Asian Games silver medalists for China
Medalists at the 1994 Asian Games
Asian Games medalists in football
Chinese football managers
Beijing Guoan F.C. managers
Beijing Guoan F.C. non-playing staff
Chinese Super League managers
Chinese communists